Scrobipalpa halonella is a moth of the family Gelechiidae. It is only known from localities in Central Europe and Russia (the southern Ural).

The larvae feed on Centaurea scabiosa. They mine the leaves of their host plant. The mine has the form of a corridor created on top of the midrib, where it withdraws during feeding pauses. From this main corridor, the larvae make irregular, branching corridors entering the leaf disk. They frequently move to another leaf. Pupation takes place outside of the mine.

References

Moths described in 1854
Scrobipalpa
Moths of Europe